The Sablier 4 was a tourism aircraft built in France in the mid-1950s.

Design
The Sablier 4 was a parasol monoplane designed for amateur construction.

Specifications

References

1950s French aircraft